Piotr Janas (born 1970) is a Polish artist. He has had solo gallery exhibitions in Berlin, Warsaw and San Francisco. In 2006, he was included in the group show Infinite Painting: Contemporary Painting and Global Realism, curated by Franceco Bonami at the Villa Manin Centro d’Arte Contemporanea as well as Polish Painting of the 21st Century at the National Gallery of Art in Warsaw and the 50th International Venice Bienniale in 2003. He currently lives and works in Warsaw, Poland.

Solo exhibitions
2010
 Istituto del Cervello, Cardi Black Box, Milan
2009
 Geometry of Meat, Nicolas Krupp, Basel
 Foksal Gallery Foundation, Warsaw
2007
 Bortolami, New York
2005
 Galerie Giti Nourbakhsch, Berlin
 Foksal, Warsaw
 Jack Hanley Gallery, Los Angeles
2004
 Wrong Gallery, New York
 Giti Nourbakhsch Gallery, Berlin
2003
 Foksal Gallery Foundation, Warsaw
 Transmission Gallery, Glasgow
Á

Selected exhibitions and projects
2006
 Polish Painting of the 21st Century Zachnta, National Gallery of Art, Warsaw
 Willa Warszawa, Raster Gallery, Warsaw
 Infinite Painting. Contemporary Painting and Global Realism / Pittura Contemporanea e Realismo
 Globale, Villa Manin Centro d’Arte Contemporanea, Passariano (cat.)
2004
 Flash at War with Enigma, Kunsthalle Basel, Basel (cat.)
2003
 Dreams and Conflicts: The Dictatorship of the Viewer, La Biennale di Venezia, Venice (cat.)
2001
 Zawody malarskie / Painters' Competition, Galeria Bielska BWA, Bielsko-Biala (curated by Adam Szymczyk) (cat.)
1998
 Galeria Rotunda, Warsaw
 November 1998 – November 1999 - "Big Movement" (collaboration with Maciej Sawicki), various locations, Warsaw
2001
 Minus, Galeria Promocyjna, Warsaw (cat.)
1999
 Received the award of EXIT art magazine in the 34th National Painting Contest “Bielska Jesien ’99”

References

External links 
 Cardi Black Box Exhibit
 Piotr Janas at Bortolami Gallery

1970 births
Living people
Polish contemporary artists
Artists from Warsaw